Victor Frederick William Cavendish-Bentinck, 9th Duke of Portland,  (18 June 1897 – 30 July 1990), known as Victor Cavendish-Bentinck until 1977 and Lord Victor Cavendish-Bentinck from 1977 to 1980, and informally as Bill Bentinck, was a British diplomat, businessman, and peer. He served as Chairman of the Joint Intelligence Committee during the Second World War and was British Ambassador to Poland between 1945 and 1947.

Background and education
Cavendish-Bentinck was born in Marylebone, London on 18 June 1897. He was the second son of Frederick Cavendish-Bentinck, whose father, George Cavendish-Bentinck, was a grandson of William Cavendish-Bentinck, 3rd Duke of Portland. Although formally Victor Cavendish-Bentinck he was known informally as Bill. Like other members of his family he dispensed with the name "Cavendish", being known simply as Bill Bentinck. He was educated at Wellington College.

Queen Elizabeth II was also descended from the 3rd Duke of Portland through her maternal grandmother Cecilia Cavendish-Bentinck. The Queen and the 9th Duke of Portland were third cousins, once removed.

Diplomatic career
Cavendish-Bentinck did not pursue a university education, instead entering the diplomatic service in 1915 at the age of 18 before taking leave to fight with the Grenadier Guards in the First World War, returning to the Foreign Office in 1919. In 1922, he took charge of administrative arrangements for the Lausanne Conference. He served in the British Embassy in Paris and also in the League of Nations Department in the Foreign Office. Other postings included Athens in 1932 and Santiago in 1933. The high point of his diplomatic career came in 1939 when he was appointed chairman of the Joint Intelligence Committee. He managed to develop the body as a highly effective instrument of government and, as a result, became counsellor to the Services Liaison Department of the Foreign Office in 1942.

However, he cast doubt on reports that were received regarding the Nazi genocide of the Jews. In late August 1943 the Polish Embassy in London informed the British government of the deportation and annihilation of hundreds of thousands of Jews from Lublin and Bialystok provinces. The chairman of the Joint Intelligence Committee, Victor Cavendish-Bentinck, deplored Polish and Jewish information about atrocities. He wrote this information as an attempt to 'stoke us up' He added: 'I feel certain that we are making a mistake in giving credence to this gas chamber story.'

In 1945, Cavendish-Bentinck was given his final diplomatic posting on his appointment as Ambassador to Poland. When visiting the formerly German City of Stettin (Szczecin) in 1946 he was invited to talk to German civilians suffering from months of internment so their possessions and property could be taken over by Polish resettlers from territories lost to the USSR. Cavendish-Bentinck refused to do so, ignoring certain inhuman circumstances under which mainly old people, women and children had to suffer, by noting to his Polish hosts, he was "convinced that they will complain as usual".

He held the position for two years before the Foreign Office applied to appoint him Ambassador to Brazil. He never took up the latter post, being obliged to resign from the Foreign Office, without a pension, as a result of the publicity surrounding his divorce. Bentinck's aristocratic background attracted press attention; Foreign Secretary Ernest Bevin, apparently sympathetic, remarked at that the time "I could have saved him if his name had been Smith."

Later life and Duke of Portland
After his withdrawal from the diplomatic service, Cavendish-Bentinck embarked on a business career, becoming Vice-Chairman of the Committee of Industrial Interests in Germany. From this position, he was able to advance the interests of British companies such as Unilever. He was a member of the Steering Committee of the Bilderberg Group.

In 1977 Cavendish-Bentinck's elder brother Ferdinand succeeded their kinsman William Cavendish-Bentinck, 7th Duke of Portland in the dukedom, becoming the 8th Duke. In the same year Cavendish-Bentinck was granted the rank of a duke's younger son, becoming styled Lord Victor Cavendish-Bentinck.

The 8th Duke died in 1980 and Lord Victor succeeded him as the 9th Duke of Portland. Upon the 9th Duke's own death in 1990, the dukedom and the Marquessate of Titchfield became extinct because the Duke's only son had predeceased him and there were no other surviving male line heirs of the 1st Duke. However, the earldom of Portland had been created in an earlier generation than the dukedom and there were surviving male line descendants of the 1st Earl. That title, along with its subsidiary titles of Viscount Woodstock and Baron Cirencester, therefore passed to the 9th Duke's kinsman Henry Noel Bentinck, who became the 11th Earl of Portland.

The 9th Duke was interred at the traditional burial place of the Dukes of Portland in the churchyard of St Winifred's Church, Holbeck in Nottinghamshire.

Marriages and children
Bentinck married Clothilde Bruce Quigley (died 1984), an American heiress, on 16 February 1924. She was the daughter of James Bruce Quigley, a Dallas, Texas wealthy businessman. They had two children together:
 William James Cavendish-Bentinck (6 July 1925 – 4 September 1966)
 Lady Margaret Cavendish-Bentinck (16 December 1929 – 1 March 2010)

Soon after World War II began Bentinck received a telephone call at his office from his Hungarian maid to tell him that his wife Clothilde had left him and taken their children with her. They were finally divorced in 1948.

Portland married secondly, Kathleen Elsie Barry (died 2004) on 27 July 1948. She was the daughter of Arthur Barry. They had one daughter:
 Lady Barbara Cavendish-Bentinck

Honours and arms
 
1 January 1942: Commander of the Order of St Michael and St George (CMG)
17 November 1977: Royal Warrant of Precedence as the younger son of a Duke

Ancestry

References
 "The Descendants of Willem Bentinck and Charlotte Aldenburg"

External links

Victor Frederick William Cavendish-Bentinck, 9th Duke of Portland

1897 births
1990 deaths
Victor Cavendish-Bentinck, 9th Duke of Portland
Ambassadors of the United Kingdom to Poland
109
Members of the Steering Committee of the Bilderberg Group
People educated at Wellington College, Berkshire
Companions of the Order of St Michael and St George
Commanders Crosses of the Order of Merit of the Federal Republic of Germany